Melodic Records is a British independent record label founded by David Cooper in 1999. Based in Manchester, England, the label have recently released their 132nd release as of October 2021 (Strawbery Guy's 'Sun Outside My Window' album) and celebrated its 20th anniversary in 2019. The label also run a label management arm, Melodic European Labels, which distributes and promotes overseas labels in Europe.

The current active Melodic roster includes artists such as Strawberry Guy, W. H. Lung, The Cool Greenhouse, Stephen Steinbrink, Cool Ghouls, Working for a Nyx Nott, and L. Pierre.

Acts that have been recently represented by the label include Working Men's Club, Man Of Moon, The Drink, Febueder, Dark Dark Dark, K-X-P, Malcolm Middleton and David Shrigley, Paume, Archie Pelago & Grenier, Patterns, Howes, The Soundcarriers, Windmill, Michael A Grammar, The Longcut and Eddy Current Suppression Ring.

Melodic's first release was the debut EP from Pedro (aka James Rutledge) in 1999. Over the years the label has been active they have released records for the likes of Baikonour, Topo Gigio, Department of Eagles, The Isles, Outputmessage, Harrisons, ARMS, The Earlies, Micah P Hinson, the Nine Black Alps, Dungen, Minotaur Shock and Psapp.

History 
Label manager & founder David Cooper started in the industry at Pomona, a music PR company then based in Hebden Bridge. Before deciding to set up his own label to release the debut EP of ambient electronic musician Pedro. In its early years, the label went on to release singles and albums for electronic artists Minotaur Shock, L.Pierre (A guise of Arab Strap's Aidan Moffat) and Baikonour.

The first release to move away from the electronic music that at that point defined the label was the debut 7", of Sheffield indie band The Harrisons. At that time a peer of The Arctic Monkeys, the band were a leading force in the so-called New Yorkshire scene. By the time The Harrisons had released their debut album in 2008, a large proportion of the Melodic roster were showcasing a more guitar-leaning side to the label. By signing Manchester bands Working For A Nuclear Free City & The Longcut, along with New Yorkers The Isles & Department Of Eagles, a new era of Melodic was born.

Working For a Nuclear Free City signed to Melodic Records in 2006, and released their self-titled debut album the same year, the first of four albums they would put out on Melodic. Spanning 10 years, their entire career was spent with Melodic, with the band gaining attention throughout, particularly for 2007 single 'Rocket'.

Nottingham Kraut-Rock / Psych-Pop band The Soundcarriers were signed to the label in 2009, and released their first two albums on Melodic. In the following years, releases included more L. Pierre content, as well as new acts Dark Dark Dark and K-X-P, the former of which was to find critical and commercial success with their albums Wild Go and Who Needs Who, as well as with a 2014 soundtrack album for the film Flood Tide.

More recently, Stephen Steinbrink has been the flagship artist for the label, releasing all three of his albums through Melodic, and his brand of well-crafted indie-folk has seen him earn critical acclaim from the likes of Pitchfork and Loud & Quiet. His debut 'Arranged Waves' was released in 2014, followed by 'Anagrams' in 2016 and last year's 'Utopia Teased'. During that period, there was also time for albums from US garage acts Cool Ghouls & Bonny Doon, two albums for London's The Drink, as well as the final L. Pierre album, '1948-'. Released only on vinyl with no sleeve, '1948-' was a concept album based around the first ever vinyl record, which is heavily sampled throughout the LP.

From 2019, Melodic took a heavier focus on local artists, signing West Yorkshire trio Working Men's Club,  Working Men's Club's debut single Bad Blood sold out of its initial pressing on pre-order, and spent a month and a half on the BBC 6 Music playlist. The young band take cues from Orange Juice and Talking Heads, and are currently touring the UK, impressing crowds with their high energy, instrument-swapping live sets. W. H. Lung's debut album Incidental Music, was released on 5 April 2019, selling out both its limited clear vinyl and its DINKED edition. Coming out to critical acclaim, the album received glowing reviews from Loud & Quiet, Q Magazine, Mojo, Uncut & The Guardian. The record was named #1 Album of the year by UK record shops Piccadilly Records & Resident. This was followed by the signings of two new UK acts, Strawberry Guy & The Cool Greenhouse. Strawberry Guy's debut EP Taking My Time To Be was released in October 2019, and has since gone on to reach over 150 million streams to date across all platforms.

The Cool Greenhouse released their debut album on Melodic in April 2020 to critical acclaim, and was the label's second entry in the DINKED series following Incidental Music. This was followed up by standalone single Alexa!. Aidan Moffat of Arab Strab released his first album under the Nyx Nott moniker on Melodic in the same year, Aux Pieds De La Nuit, with a follow up planned for spring 2022.

Melodic began 2021 with the release of Cool Ghouls' At Georges Zoo, then in the summer announced both the debut album of Strawberry Guy & the return of W. H. Lung. Vanities, the second album from W. H. Lung was released on 8th October to acclaim from outlets including Stereogum, The Times & Paste. Strawberry Guy's much anticipated debut full-length Sun Outside My Window was released on 31st October, to coverage from NME, Line Of Best Fit & more. In December 2021 W. H. Lung embarked on a UK wide tour in support of the album, and both Strawberry Guy & W. H. Lung are due to travel to the USA for SXSW 2022.

References

External links
Official website
Facebook

British independent record labels
Record labels established in 1999
1999 establishments in the United Kingdom